State Trunk Highway 50 (often called Highway 50, STH-50 or WIS 50) is a  state highway in Walworth and Kenosha counties in Wisconsin, United States, that runs from Wisconsin Highway 11 (WIS 11) in Delavan east to Wisconsin Highway 32 (WIS 32) in Kenosha. The highway is maintained by the Wisconsin Department of Transportation.

Route description

Highway 50 begins at an intersection with Highway 11 in Delavan. The highway crosses Wisconsin and Southern Railroad tracks and heads east to a junction with Interstate 43 at Exit 21. Highway 50 continues southeast out of Delavan, crossing Delavan Lake at the city's eastern border, and intersects Highway 67 north of Williams Bay. Highway 50 heads east from this intersection toward Lake Geneva, where it intersects Highway 120. Shortly after this intersection, Highway 50 meets U.S. Route 12 at Exit 330. The highway continues eastward from Lake Geneva to the border of Kenosha County.

After entering Kenosha County, Highway 50 passes the community of Slades Corners before meeting Highway 83 in New Munster. The two highways become concurrent and continue eastward until they meet Highway 75 in Paddock Lake. At this junction, Highway 83 turns southward, and Highway 50 continues eastward toward Bristol. The highway intersects U.S. Route 45 in Bristol and continues east to meet Interstate 94 and U.S. Route 41 at Exit 344. Highway 50 then straddles the border of Kenosha and Pleasant Prairie, meeting Highway 31 along this border. The highway then turns northeast and passes through Kenosha before terminating at Highway 32.

History

Highway 50 was designated in 1917, and signage for the highway was posted in 1918. The highway has changed little since and still follows its original route for most of its length. The route of Highway 50 through Kenosha changed in 1997; the highway moved from 75th Street to a more northerly alignment along Roosevelt Road and 63rd Street.

Major intersections

See also

References

External links

050
Transportation in Walworth County, Wisconsin
Transportation in Kenosha County, Wisconsin